George Jamieson may refer to:

George Jamieson (diplomat) (1843–1920), British diplomat and judge in East Asia
George Auldjo Jamieson (1828–1900), Scottish businessman, chartered accountant and local councillor
George W. Jamieson (1810–1868), American actor and lapidary
George Jamieson, birth name of April Ashley